The men's 100 metre freestyle competition at the 2010 Pan Pacific Swimming Championships took place on August 19 at the William Woollett Jr. Aquatics Center.  The last champion was Brent Hayden of Canada.

This race consisted of two lengths of the pool, both lengths being in freestyle.

Records
Prior to this competition, the existing world and Pan Pacific records were as follows:

Results
All times are in minutes and seconds.

Heats
The first round was held on August 19, at 10:16.

B Final 
The B final was held on August 19, at 18:16.

A Final 
The A final was held on August 19, at 18:16.

References

2010 Pan Pacific Swimming Championships